Angels Fall is a 1982 play by Lanford Wilson.

Angels Fall may also refer to:

 "Fall of the angels", an Islamic-Judeo-Christian religious event resulting from the War in Heaven
 Angels Fall (film), a 2007 American television adaptation of the Nora Roberts novel (see below)
 "Angels Fall" (song), by Breaking Benjamin, 2015
 Angels' Fall, a 1957/2013 novel by Frank Herbert
 Angels Fall, a 2006 novel by Nora Roberts

See also 
 Angel Falls (disambiguation)
 Angelfall, a 2011 novel by Susan Ee
 Fallen angel (disambiguation)
 Fallen Angels (disambiguation)
 Falling Angels (disambiguation)